Stokke Idrettslag is a Norwegian sports club from Stokke, Vestfold. It has sections for association football, team handball, orienteering, gymnastics and Nordic skiing.

It was founded on 15 January 1931 as the skiing club Stokke SK. Known skiers from Stokke IL include Kristian Horntvedt., Kristoffer R. Moslet and Sindre Stokke. Stokke IL ski team finished third in the Norwegian championship in 2007 at Meråker. The team consisted of Sindre Stokke, Espen Harald Bjerke and Kristian Horntvedt.

The men's football team currently plays in the Fourth Division, the fifth tier of Norwegian football. It last played in the Norwegian Second Division in 1997.

References

 Official site 

Football clubs in Norway
Sport in Vestfold og Telemark
Association football clubs established in 1931
1931 establishments in Norway